In Greek mythology, Astraeus or Astraios (Ancient Greek: Ἀστραῖος means "starry") may refer to three various figures:

 Astraeus, one of the Titans, son of Eurybia and Crius. He was the father of the four Anemoi by his wife Eos.
 Astraeus, son of Silenus and chief of the satyrs who came to join Dionysus in the Indian War.
 Astraeus, a Mysian son of Poseidon. In the height of Athena's nocturnal solemnities, he deflowered his sister by mistake and took a ring at the same time from her finger. The next day, understanding   the error which he had committed, Astraeus in his grief threw himself headlong into the river Adurus. This was called later on Astraeus after him and afterwards changed into the Caicus, the son of Hermes.

Notes

References 

 Apollodorus, The Library with an English Translation by Sir James George Frazer, F.B.A., F.R.S. in 2 Volumes, Cambridge, MA, Harvard University Press; London, William Heinemann Ltd. 1921. ISBN 0-674-99135-4. Online version at the Perseus Digital Library. Greek text available from the same website.
 Hesiod, Theogony from The Homeric Hymns and Homerica with an English Translation by Hugh G. Evelyn-White, Cambridge, MA.,Harvard University Press; London, William Heinemann Ltd. 1914. Online version at the Perseus Digital Library. Greek text available from the same website.
 Lucius Mestrius Plutarchus, Morals translated from the Greek by several hands. Corrected and revised by. William W. Goodwin, PH. D. Boston. Little, Brown, and Company. Cambridge. Press Of John Wilson and son. 1874. 5. Online version at the Perseus Digital Library.
 Nonnus of Panopolis, Dionysiaca translated by William Henry Denham Rouse (1863-1950), from the Loeb Classical Library, Cambridge, MA, Harvard University Press, 1940.  Online version at the Topos Text Project.
 Nonnus of Panopolis, Dionysiaca. 3 Vols. W.H.D. Rouse. Cambridge, MA., Harvard University Press; London, William Heinemann, Ltd. 1940–1942. Greek text available at the Perseus Digital Library.

Children of Poseidon
Satyrs